Martin Maingaud (died 1725; fl.1692-c.1725) was a French portraitist.

External links
Martin Maingaud on artnet.com
Princesses Anne, Amelia and Caroline, 1721 by Maingaud, in the British Royal Collection

1725 deaths
French portrait painters
18th-century French painters
French male painters
Year of birth missing
18th-century French male artists